The United Party for National Development (UPND) is a liberal political party in Zambia, led by Hakainde Hichilema, the current president of the country. The party is an observer member of the Africa Liberal Network.

History
The UPND was established in December 1998 and was initially led by Anderson Mazoka, who had left the Movement for Multi-Party Democracy (MMD) shortly beforehand. Mazoka was the party's presidential candidate for the 2001 general elections, finishing second with 27% of the vote, less than 2% behind the winner Levy Mwanawasa of the MMD. In the National Assembly elections the UPND won 49 seats, becoming the second largest party after the MMD.

In March 2006 the party joined the United Democratic Alliance, formed by the three largest opposition parties to contest that year's general elections. After the death of Mazoka in May 2006, Hakainde Hichilema became party leader, and was the alliance's presidential candidate. However, he finished third behind Mwanawasa and Michael Sata with 25% of the vote. The UDA won only 26 seats in the National Assembly, down from the 74 the three parties had won in 2001.

Hichilema was the UPND candidate for the 2008 presidential by-election, finishing third with 20% of the vote. He finished third again in the 2011 general elections with 18% of the vote, whilst the UPND won 28 seats in the National Assembly, becoming the third-largest party.

Hichilema was selected as the party's candidate for the 2015 presidential by-election. Hichilema become the main opponent to the Patriotic Front (PF) candidate Edgar Lungu after receiving the backing of several MMD MPs. Although Hichilema received 47% of the vote, Lungu was elected with 48%.

In the 2021 General Election, after almost 23 years in opposition the UPND became the largest party in the National Assembly adding 24 more seats and making a total 82 seats forming 46.64% of parliament. This is whilst PF lost 21 seats bringing their total to 59, forming 35.30% of parliament and subsequently becoming Zambia's largest opposition party.

On the executive level the UPND President Hakainde Hichilema was re-elected to the party presidency at the elective General Conference on 14 February 2021 and Mutale Nalumango was appointed as his running-mate on the 23rd February 2021. Also leading to the 2021 General Election on 12 August the UPND formed an alliance in March dubbed the 'UPND Alliance' with several smaller political parties including former PF members and allies such as former finance minister Felix Mutati, lawyer Kevin Bwalya Fube and Charles Milupi among others. After 3 months of official campaigns that were briefly suspended first voluntarily upon the death of Zambia's first President Kenneth Kuanda in June, and then on instruction from the electoral authority due to incidents of political violence in the Lusaka, Mpulungu, Nakonde and Namwala districts Hichilema and Nalumango were elected President-Elect and Vice President-Elect with 59.02% of the vote. Therefore, with 2,852,348 votes and a 20.31% margin from the runner-up candidates (Edgar Lungu and Nkandu Luo)  it is the  largest vote share any presidential election has seen since the 1996 General Election where Zambia's second president Fredrick Chiluba won with 72.59% of the vote leaving a 59.84% margin from his closest opponent.

Youth representation
The UPND has a youth league, the UPND Youth League formed to mobilise youth concerns. It represents young people from across Zambia. The party has signed a social contract with the youths making it the first political party in Africa to have a youthful agenda.

Electoral history

Presidential elections

National Assembly elections

References

Further reading

Political parties in Zambia
Political parties established in 1998
Liberal parties in Africa
1998 establishments in Zambia
Liberal International